Legal education in Pakistan was initiated before independence and dates back to the 1800s. The first legal education institution was established under the name of ‘University Law College’ in 1868. Currently, there are more than 150 institutions offering law programs, which include universities and law colleges. These institutions are regulated by the Pakistan Bar Council (PBC) and Higher Education Commission (HEC). Currently School of Law, Quaid-i-Azam university, Islamabad has been ranked No.1 in Pakistan.

Ranking of law schools 
1. Quaid-i-Azam University, Islamabad 

2. International Islamic University, Islamabad

3. Lahore University of Management Sciences, Lahore

4. University of Punjab

5.University of Lahore, Lahore

6. Islamia College University, Peshawar

7.Peshawar University, Peshawar

8. Bahria University, Islamabad

9. Bahauddin Zakria University, Multan

10. Government College University, Faisalabad

Major law schools

Law schools in Pakistan

Islamabad Federal Capital Territory
 School of Law, Quaid i Azam University
S3H, National University of Sciences and Technology

Balochistan
 City School of Law, Quetta
 Jhalawan Law College, Khuzdar
 Zarghoon Law College, Quetta
 National Law College(NIHE), Quetta

Khyber Pakhtoonkhwa
 Abdul Wali Khan University Mardan
 Gomal University, Dera Ismail Khan
 Frontier Law College, Dera Ismail Khan
 Luqman College of Law, Dera Ismail Khan
 Abraham Lincoln School of Law, Bannu
 Hazara University, Mansehra
Saani Islamia Law College, Haripur
 University of Peshawar, Peshawar
 Khyber Law College. University of Peshawar 
 Abbott Law College, Abbottabad
 Abbott Law College, Mansehra
 Ayub Law College, Haripur, Pakistan
 Centre for Studies in Law and Democracy, Peshawar
 Frontier Law College, Peshawar115402
 Institute of Legal Studies, Peshawar
 Islamia Law College, Peshawar
 Jinnah Law College, Peshawar
 Justice Law College, Abbottabad
 Kohat Law College, Kohat
 Mardan Law College, Mardan
 Muslim Law College, Swat District
 Peshawar Law College, Peshawar
 Quaid-e-Azam Institute of Legal Studies, Nowshera, Khyber Pakhtunkhwa
 Supreme Law College, Peshawar
 Swabi Law College, Swabi

Punjab
Muhammad Ali Jinnah Law College, Gujranwala
School of Law and Policy, University of Management and Technology, Lahore
 University of Lahore (Postgraduate Institute of Law)
 Kinnaird Law School, Lahore
Bahauddin Zakariya University, Gillani Law College, Multan
Quaid-e-Azam Law College, Sargodha
Multan Law College Multan
Multan Law College D.G. Khan
Jinnah Law College D.G. Khan (MAQ)
Supreme Law College Multan
Noor Law College Multan
INEX Law Academy Multan
 Islamia University Bahawalpur
Bahawalpur Law College, Bahawalpur
Millat Law College, Bahawalpur
AIPS Law college, Bahawalpur
Ali Law College, Rahimyar Khan
 Jinnah Muslim Law College, Islamabad
University College Lahore, Lahore
Lahore University of Management Sciences, School of Humanities, Social Sciences & Law, Lahore
University of the Punjab
Quaid-e-Azam Law College, Lahore
Quaid-e-Azam Law College, Okara
Quaid-e-Azam Law College, Sargodha
Cornelius Law College, Sargodha
Premier Law College, Gujranwala 
Allama Iqbal Law College, Sialkot
City Law College, Lahore
Ghousia Law College, Okara
Gujrat Law College, Gujrat
School of Law, Lahore
Hamayat Islam Law College, Lahore
Himayat-e-Islam Degree College for Women, Lahore
Jinnah Law College, Jhelum
CIMS School of Law, Ichra Lahore
Lahore Law College, Lahore
 Toppers Law College, Lahore
Lyallpur Law College, Faisalabad
Muhammad Ali Jinnah Law College, Gujranwala
Muhammadan Law College, Sheikhupura
Muslim Law College, Rawalpindi
National Institute of legal studies Attock
Pakistan College of Law, Lahore
Leads Law College, Lahore
Punjab Law College, Lahore
Punjab Law College, Rawalpindi
Rawalpindi Law College, Rawalpindi
Superior College of Law, Lahore
Jandanwala College of Law, Jandanwala (Kharian)
 Royal Law College Arifwala (03321000050)
 Royal Law College Bahawalnagar (03321000050)
 Royal Law College Burewala (03321000050)<ref

Azad Kashmir
University of Azad Jammu and Kashmir
Mirpur University of Sciences and technology law school
University of kotli
Kashmir Law college
Techera law college

Sindh
 Denning Law School, Karachi [LLB (Hons.) of University of London] https://www.denninglawschool.com/
 Ziauddin University Faculty of Law https://zfl.zu.edu.pk/
 Themis School of Law, Karachi [LLB (Hons.) of University of London], Bar Transfer Test, https://themis.com.pk/
 Shaheed Zulfiqar Ali Bhutto Institute of Science and Technology
 L'ecole for Advanced Studies, Karachi 
 Dadabhoy Institute of Higher Education, Karachi
 Federal Urdu University, Karachi
 Hamdard University, Karachi
 Shah Abdul Latif University, Khairpur
 Govt. ABD Law College, Sukkur
 Govt. Law College, Khairpur
 Govt. Shaheed Benazir Bhutto Law College, Larkana
 Haji Moula Bux Law College, Shikarpur, Sindh
 Law College, Ghotki
 Law College, Naushahro Feroze
 Sardar Noor Muhammad Khan Bijarani Law College, Kandhkot
 University of Karachi, Karachi
 Islamia Law College, Karachi
 Sindh Muslim Law College, Karachi
 University of Sindh, Jamshoro
 Sindh Mehran Institute of Law (SMIL), Jamshoro
 Govt. Hyderabad Sindh Law College, Hyderabad, Sindh
 Govt. Jinnah Law college, Hyderabad, Sindh
 Govt. Pir Illahi Bux Law College, Dadu, Pakistan
 Indus College Of Law, Hyderabad, Sindh www.induscollegeoflaw.edu.pk
 Law College, Mirpur Khas
 Quaid-e-Azam Law College (Estd. Since 1998), affiliated University of Sindh, Jamshoro Pakistan, Nawabshah, Shaheed BenazirAbad
Bilawal Bhutto Zardari Law College, Kambar Qambar Shahdadkot District
 Everest Law College, Hyderabad, Sindh

LLB awarding bodies
The following universities are authorized to award law degrees in Pakistan:
 School of Law and Policy, University of Management and Technology, Lahore
 University of Sindh, Sindh
 University of Gujrat, Punjab
 Quaid-i-Azam University, Islamabad
 GC University, Faisalabad
 Lailpur Law College, Faisalabad
 Govt SM Law College University Of Karachi, Karachi
 University of Peshawar, Khyber Pakhtunkhwa
 University of Malakand, Khyber Pakhtunkhwa
 Swat University, Khyber Pakhtunkhwa
 Hazara University, Mansehra, Khyber Pakhtunkhwa
 University of Punjab, Lahore
 University of Sindh, Hyderabad
 University of Balochistan, Quetta
 Bahauddin Zakaria University, Multan
 Gomal University, Dera Ismail Khan
 Shah Abdul Latif University, Khairpur
 Islamia University, Bhawalpur
 Hamdard University, Karachi
 Kinnaird College for Women University, Lahore
 International Islamic University, Islamabad
 Sargodha University, Sargodha
 LUMS, Lahore

law college

 Islamia College University, Peshawar
 Bahria University, Islamabad
 University College Lahore, Lahore
 University of Karachi, Karachi
 Federal Urdu University, Karachi
 Shah Abdul Latif University, Khairpur
 School of Law, Gulberg, Lahore
 Islamia Law College, Karachi

See also
 Bachelor of Laws: Pakistan
 Doctor of law: Pakistan
 Law of Pakistan
 Legal education in Pakistan
 List of universities in Pakistan
 Lists of law schools
 Master of Laws: Pakistan

References
 

Pakistan
Law schools in Pakistan
Legal education in Pakistan
 
Law schools